Alan Little (born 5 February 1955) is an English former professional footballer and manager. He played as a midfielder. Little made over 400 appearances in his senior career, with the most caps coming with Southend United and Barnsley. Little then went on to manage from 1993 to 2002, with seven seasons coming with York City.

Playing career
Alan Little was born in Horden, County Durham. He served his apprenticeship at Aston Villa and, alongside his brother, Brian, was in the youth side which beat Liverpool to win the FA Youth Cup in 1972. He turned professional in January 1973 and on 5 October 1974, made his full league debut, a 2–1 win away to Oldham Athletic. This was the first of just three league appearances for Villa.

In December 1974 he was sold to Southend United for £10,000. The following season, he was a regular in the side that reached the fifth round of the FA Cup. He made 102 full appearances (+ 1 as a substitute) and scored 12 goals for 'the Shrimpers'. In August 1977, Barnsley paid £6,000 to take him to Oakwell, where he played 91 times, scoring 14 goals. December 1979 saw Little on the move again, this time to Doncaster Rovers, who paid a club record £25,000 for his services.

He provided the experience that Billy Bremner's young side needed, and became a great favourite with the Doncaster fans, winning the supporters'  Player of the Year award, before moving to Torquay United in October 1982 in a deal that saw Clive Wigginton move in the opposite direction. He scored four times in 51 games for Torquay, leaving to join Halifax Town in November 1983, playing 68 times (and scoring 6 goals) for 'the Shaymen' before joining Hartlepool United as player-coach in July 1985.

Throughout his playing career Little earned a reputation as a fiercely competitive, tough tackling midfielder, which made him highly respected by supporters and fellow players alike.

Coaching and managerial career
Little was forced to retire due to injury in May 1986 and stayed at Hartlepool, where he was given the opportunity of coaching the juniors. He was later appointed assistant to manager John Bird, and when Bird became the manager at York City in September 1988, Little went with him as assistant manager. In October 1991, after an unsuccessful three years, Bird was sacked. The new manager, John Ward, retained Little as his assistant. Under Ward, York became a stronger side and in the 1992–93 season made a push for promotion. However, in March 1993, Ward left to manage Bristol Rovers, leaving Little in charge.

His first game as York manager was a 5–1 win away to promotion rivals Barnet. York eventually finished fourth in the Third Division and had to settle for a play-off place. After a 1–0 aggregate win over Bury in the semi-finals, York gained a place in Second Division by beating Crewe Alexandra on a penalty shoot-out at Wembley Stadium.

The following season, York almost repeated the feat, but were beaten in the Second Division play-off semi-finals by Stockport County. There were other highlights during Little's time at York, most notably the League Cup wins over Manchester United in 1995, and Everton in 1996. However, York's overall form under Little deteriorated and after a run of 10 games without victory he was sacked on 15 March 1999. York were relegated that season having only dropped into the relegation zone on the last day of the season.

In April 1999, Little returned to his old club, Southend United, after the resignation of Alvin Martin, helping them to avoid the drop into the Football Conference at the end of the season. He also helped them survive a serious financial crisis by slashing the wage bill and rebuilding a much cheaper side. His dismissal on 28 September 2000 came as a surprise as, despite a poor start to the season, it came after a five-game unbeaten run that saw 'the Shrimpers' rise to 10th in the Third Division. He was replaced by David Webb on 2 October 2000.

In June 2001, he was appointed Chief Scout at Hull City, managed by his older brother Brian. On 12 October 2001, Little was appointed as manager of former club Halifax Town. With only three league wins before falling ill with appendicitis in March 2002, Little was sacked. Halifax were relegated to the Conference at the end of the season and went out of business six years later.

Managerial statistics

References

External links

1955 births
Living people
People from Horden
Footballers from County Durham
English footballers
Association football midfielders
Aston Villa F.C. players
Southend United F.C. players
Barnsley F.C. players
Doncaster Rovers F.C. players
Torquay United F.C. players
Halifax Town A.F.C. players
Hartlepool United F.C. players
English Football League players
English football managers
York City F.C. managers
Southend United F.C. managers
Halifax Town A.F.C. managers
English Football League managers
York City F.C. non-playing staff
Hartlepool United F.C. non-playing staff